For the 2021 Eastercon called ConFusion, see Eastercon#Future Eastercons

ConFusion is an annual science fiction convention and was founded back in 1974 by a University of Michigan science fiction club known as the Stilyagi Air Corps and is currently run by the Ann Arbor Science Fiction Association a not-for-profit group.  Typically, it is held during the third weekend of January.  It is the oldest science fiction convention in Michigan, a regional, general SF con similar to Windycon and Lunacon. The programming consists of panels on science fiction and fantasy literature, media, science, fandom, art, comics, music, costuming, etc. with discussions by authors, scientists, fans, and artists. There is a large music track, board and roleplaying games, KidFusion — a track of programming specifically for kids — and a masquerade or costume contest.

ConFusion has a consuite, as well as room parties hosted by other conventions, WorldCon bids, and local clubs.

History
The Ann Arbor Relax-i-con was founded in 1974. Based on its success, the Stilyagi Air Corps named the new convention "Condom" as a takeoff of the word "fandom." The chairman, Ro Nagey, was absent for the meeting about the name change and convinced them to use the name 'ConFusion' instead. The name turned out to be prophetic as the first science Guest of Honor was the owner of local technology spin-off company KMS Fusion.

Because the first con run by the organization was not actually named ConFusion, they are generally counted starting with ConFusion 13 in 1975 or with the A Squared Relax-I-Con(one of many intentionally confusing names voted on by the membership).  The 1980 con was aptly named Confusion 6 &/or 7, and ConFusion XXX in 2004 could be considered the 30th convention of that name, or 31st Stilyagi con.

The Stilyagi Air Corps, named after a group in Robert A. Heinlein's The Moon is a Harsh Mistress, is a loose, informal group, lifetime membership is free for anyone interested in Science Fiction who attends a single Stilyagi party, meeting, or event.  The sponsoring organization, AASFA, is a Michigan nonprofit corporation board elected from Stilyagi who have volunteered to work on running ConFusion.

Years of ConFusion

References

 metrotimes article on ConFusion 31
 List of past years' ConFusion titles, Conchairs, and Guests of Honor
 History of Stilyagi and ConFusion

External links

Stilyagi Air Corps website

Science fiction conventions in the United States
Recurring events established in 1974
Culture of Ann Arbor, Michigan
Conventions in Michigan